Benson Flores, sometimes called Ben Flores (c. 1848 – April 11, 1929), was one of the early Filipino Canadians to settle in Bowen Island, B.C. He was the first known Filipino to migrant to Canada on record.
 
The exact location of Benson Flores' birth is not known although it is believed he was from the Philippines together with other fishermen who ferried locals around the area and fished to make a living in Snug Cove.

According to the Bowen Island Museum and Archives, Flores operated the first boat rental in Snug Cove. He was referred to as "Old Ben."

Flores suffered from  bladder and kidney disease. At age 81, he died on April 11, 1929, in Vancouver General Hospital. He was buried in an unmarked grave in Horne 2 Mountain View Cemetery (Vancouver).

See also 
Filipino Canadians

References 

1840s births
1929 deaths
Filipino emigrants to Canada
Asian-Canadian culture in British Columbia
People from Greater Vancouver
Year of birth uncertain